Frank M. Wilkes Power Plant is an 879 megawatt (MW), natural gas power plant located northwest of Jefferson, Texas in Marion County, Texas. The plant began operations in 1964.

All three units use natural gas shipped via pipeline.  The power plant is named after former Southwestern Electric Power Company (SWEPCO) president Frank M. Wilkes.

Units

See also
List of power stations in Texas

External links
  AEP.com: American Electric Power website

Buildings and structures in Marion County, Texas
Natural gas-fired power stations in Texas
Energy infrastructure completed in 1964
American Electric Power